The white-rimmed brushfinch (Atlapetes leucopis) is a species of bird in the family Passerellidae. It is found in Colombia and Ecuador.

Its natural habitats are subtropical or tropical moist montane forest and heavily degraded former forest.

References

Atlapetes
Birds described in 1878
Taxa named by Philip Sclater
Taxa named by Osbert Salvin
Taxonomy articles created by Polbot